Nueva Trinidad is a municipality in the Chalatenango department of El Salvador.

Municipalities of the Chalatenango Department